The First Minister of Scotland is the leader of the Scottish Government, Scotland's devolved government. The First Minister is responsible for the exercise of functions by the Cabinet of the Scottish Government; policy development and coordination; relationships with the rest of the United Kingdom, Europe and the wider world. The First Minister is a Member of the Scottish Parliament (MSP), and is nominated by the Scottish Parliament before being officially appointed by the monarch.

Currently, the First Minister is Nicola Sturgeon of the Scottish National Party (SNP), who succeeded Alex Salmond in November 2014 following his resignation after the 2014 Scottish independence referendum. Sturgeon has led the Government of the 6th Scottish Parliament since 2021. Sturgeon, and before that, Alex Salmond, previously led the governments of the 3rd and 4th Scottish Parliaments which was first elected in 2007 as a minority government, and re-elected in 2011, where they formed the first majority government in the Scottish Parliament.

Sturgeon is the longest-serving First Minister, having surpassed Salmond on 25 May 2022. Salmond in turn spent a total of 7 and a half years in the role. Donald Dewar was the first person to hold the position.

Chronological list of first ministers of Scotland

Timeline

References

Notes

Citations

External links
 Scottish Government web site

Scotland

First Minister of Scotland
First Minister of Scotland